Klyopovka is a rural locality (a selo) and the administrative center of Klyopovskoye Rural Settlement, Buturlinovsky District, Voronezh Oblast, Russia. The population was 2,453 as of 2010. There are 29 streets.

Geography 
Klyopovka is located 19 km southwest of Buturlinovka (the district's administrative centre) by road. Puzevo is the nearest rural locality.

References 

Rural localities in Buturlinovsky District